The Bévéra (in French) or Bevera (in Italian) (Beura in Occitan and Ligurian) is a river of southeastern France and northwestern Italy.

Geography 
Bévéra source is in the Maritime Alps, near Moulinet in the French Alpes-Maritimes department. It flows generally southeast, through Sospel, crosses the Italian border (province of Imperia) and discharges into the river Roya, near Ventimiglia. The Basséra is one of its tributaries.

Conservation 
Most of the Ligurian part of Bevera valley, along with the Italian slopes of Monte Grammondo, belongs to a SIC (Site of Community Importance) called M. Grammondo T. Bevera (code IT 1315717).

References

External links 

Rivers of France
Rivers of Italy
Rivers of Liguria
Rivers of the Province of Imperia
Rivers of Alpes-Maritimes
Rivers of Provence-Alpes-Côte d'Azur
Rivers of the Alps
International rivers of Europe